Wŏnsanhang station (Wŏnsan Port station) is a freight-only railway station serving the port of Wŏnsan city, Kangwŏn province, North Korea, on the terminus of the Wŏnsan Port Line Line of the Korean State Railway. 

In addition to the port's bulk cargo terminal, this line also serves the Wŏnsan Chemical Factory.

References

Railway stations in North Korea